Josef Wenzig (18 January 1807 – 28 August 1876) was a Bohemian writer and author of librettos.

Life
Born in Prague, Empire of Austria, Wenzig was an educator in noble families, rector of the Czech Realschule in Prague and from 1833, professor of German language and geography. During his teaching he also contributed to the equalisation of the Czech language with German in schools (Wenzig law). He was the director of the Artists' Association (Umělecká beseda) where he met Bedřich Smetana.

Wenzig died in Turnov, Austria-Hungary aged 69 and was buried at the Olšany Cemetery.

Work 
Wenzig tried his hand as a writer and wrote a play that was positively reviewed by Jan Neruda. However, as a playwright he was insignificant for his time. Better known are his librettos, which he first wrote in German and then had translated into Czech, Dalibor and Libuše, both set to music by Smetana. Many of his poems were set to music by Johannes Brahms.

He also translated Czech/Slovak lieder, poems, fairy tales and sagas into German – including the book of Slovak folk tales , which was filmed several times.

Further reading

References

External links 

 
 Werke von Josef Wenzig im Projekt Gutenberg-DE

Czech writers in German
Librettists
Czech poets
Politicians from Prague
Members of the Bohemian Diet
Translators from Slovak
Translators from Czech
Translators to German
1807 births
1876 deaths
Writers from Prague
Burials at Olšany Cemetery
German-language poets
19th-century translators